Luigi Bruins (born 9 March 1987) is a Dutch professional footballer who plays as an attacking midfielder for VV Smitshoek.

After being declined by Feyenoord at the age of six, the Rotterdam-born went through the complete Excelsior youth academy. Bruins made his first team debut in the season 2004–05 and managed to win the Eerste Divisie title in the subsequent season. After a successful Eredivisie debut, Bruins signed a four-year deal with the club that first declined him, Feyenoord.

Bruins was part of the Netherlands U21 squad winning the UEFA European Under-21 Football Championship in 2007.

Early life
Bruins was born in Rotterdam, South Holland, the Netherlands.

Club career

Youth career
Bruins started playing football at the age of six. As the Rotterdam-born was aiming for the highest level, he signed up for a talent practice session at Feyenoord. However, Feyenoord decided not to invite Bruins to join the youth academy. Eventually, Bruins was asked to join Excelsior instead. Bruins went through the complete Excelsior youth academy, until he made his professional debut in 2005.

Excelsior (2004–2007)

Breakthrough (2004–2006)
Bruins made his professional debut for Excelsior in the season 2004–05. On 28 January 2005, Bruins replaced Santi Kolk in the 78th minute of the Eerste Divisie away match against FC Eindhoven (3–0). It was the first and only match Bruins played in his first season.

Bruins had his breakthrough in the season 2005–06. Under the management of the new Excelsior coach Mario Been, Bruins was positioned on his favorite right midfielder position in a 4–3–3 system. Bruins scored his first professional goal in the season opening away match against Cambuur Leeuwarden (0–1) on 12 August 2005. From the start of the season, Excelsior unexpectedly battled for the Eerste Divisie championship. When Excelsior won the home match against championship favorite VVV-Venlo (3–1) on 31 March 2006, the third club from Rotterdam secured the Eerste Divisie 2005–06 title. Bruins played an important role in Excelsior's Eredivisie promotion, scoring 4 goals in 35 matches.

Eredivisie (2006–2007)
After Excelsior's surprising promotion, the Rotterdam club was an almost certain relegation candidate for the season 2006–07. The club had the lowest Eredivisie budget and only few players with Eredivisie experience. Bruins made his Eredivisie debut on 19 August 2006, in the home match against Roda JC (0–1). Bruins scored his first Eredivisie goals on 9 September 2006, as he scored two penalty kicks in the home match against SC Heerenveen (3–1). Excelsior finished the Eredivisie on a 16th place, which meant they had to compete in the promotion/relegation playoffs. After wins against BV Veendam and RBC Roosendaal, Excelsior remained in the top tier.

While at Excelsior, Bruins was linked to various domestic and foreign clubs. Besides the Dutch sides Ajax, AZ and PSV, also Tottenham Hotspur were interested in the talented midfielder. However, on 26 January 2006, Feyenoord announced the signing of Bruins. The youngster would join the club for the season 2007–08, signing a four-year deal.

Feyenoord (2007–2011)

Left winger (2007–2008)
Bruins transfer to Feyenoord was overshadowed by the arrival of experienced players like Roy Makaay from Bayern Munich, Giovanni van Bronckhorst from Barcelona and Kevin Hofland from VfL Wolfsburg. Due to the heavy competition within the team, it was expected the talented Bruins would mainly play a role as substitute. However, after the departure of Royston Drenthe to Real Madrid, Feyenoord coach Bert van Marwijk promoted Bruins to a first team regular, filling in the left winger position. Bruins played 27 Eredivisie matches in his first Feyenoord season, scoring six goals.

Struggle (2008–2011)
After various minor injuries, Bruins slowly started to lose his first team regular status in the season 2008–09. Due to lack of playing time, player agent Sietje Mouch stated it was better for Bruins to temporary leave Feyenoord on loan in the winter transfer window of January 2010.

Red Bull Salzburg (2011)
In October 2011, he signed a contract with Red Bull Salzburg until the end of the 2011–12 season. His contract was cancelled after only three games and he left Salzburg at the end of 2011.

Return to Excelsior (2012)
Luigi Bruins went on trial at Rangers F.C. and was linked with VVV-Venlo. On 9 March 2012, Bruins signed with his former team Excelsior until the end of the season.

Nice (2013–2014)
He signed a contract with OGC Nice on 15 January 2013. In one and a half years' time, he played 22 matches for the French side, in which he scored once. After his contract had not been extended, he left the club as a free agent in June 2014.

Second return to Excelsior (2014–2021)
On 13 September 2014, it was announced that Bruins had returned to Excelsior for the third time. He signed a deal until the end of the season.

Amateur level
In July 2021, he joined fifth-tier Hoofdklasse club VV Smitshoek for a three-year term.

International career

Youth teams

Netherlands U21
Bruins was part of the Netherlands U21 winning the 2007 UEFA European Under-21 Football Championship. Jong Oranje retained its 2006 UEFA European Under-21 Football Championship title in style with a 4–1 win over Serbia U21 in the final. Bruins scored the fourth Dutch goal, securing the victory.

In the summer of 2008, Bruins missed out on a place in the Netherlands Olympic team. He was mentioned in the pre-selection, but wasn't part of the final 18.

Career statistics

Honours
Excelsior
 Eerste Divisie: 2005–06

Feyenoord
 KNVB Cup: 2007–08

Netherlands U21
 UEFA European Under-21 Football Championship: 2007

References

External links
 
  
  
 Luigi Bruins at Voetbal International 

1987 births
Living people
Footballers from Rotterdam
Dutch footballers
Netherlands under-21 international footballers
Dutch people of Italian descent
Association football midfielders
Eredivisie players
Eerste Divisie players
Ligue 1 players
Championnat National 2 players
Championnat National 3 players
Austrian Football Bundesliga players
Vierde Divisie players
Excelsior Rotterdam players
Feyenoord players
FC Red Bull Salzburg players
OGC Nice players
Dutch expatriate footballers
Expatriate footballers in Austria
Expatriate footballers in France
Dutch expatriate sportspeople in Austria
Dutch expatriate sportspeople in France